Manfredo P. Alipala (1938-2006) was a Filipino boxer who competed at the 1964 Summer Olympics.

He won a gold medal at the 1962 Asian Games.

Alipala died in his sleep at his family residence in Barangay San Roque, Tarlac City on October 8, 2006, at age 68. He was buried at the Garden of Peace Memorial Park in Sapang Maragul, also within the city.

Amateur career

Olympic Games results
1964
Defeated Al-Kharki Khalid (Iraq) 
Lost to Kichijiro Hamada (Japan) 0-5

Professional boxing record 

| style="text-align:center;" colspan="8"|3 Wins (1 knockouts), 8 Losses (4 knockouts, 1 decision)
|-  style="text-align:center; background:#e3e3e3;"
|  style="border-style:none none solid solid; "|Res.
|  style="border-style:none none solid solid; "|Record
|  style="border-style:none none solid solid; "|Opponent
|  style="border-style:none none solid solid; "|Type
|  style="border-style:none none solid solid; "|Rd., Time
|  style="border-style:none none solid solid; "|Date
|  style="border-style:none none solid solid; "|Location
|  style="border-style:none none solid solid; "|Notes
|- align=center
|Lose||3–8 || align=left| Cassius Naito
| ||  || 
|align=left| 
|align=left|
|- align=center
|Lose||3–7 || align=left| Takeshi Fuji
| ||  || 
|align=left| 
|align=left|
|- align=center
|Lose||3–6 || align=left| Choi Sun Kap
| ||  || 
|align=left| 
|align=left|
|- align=center
|Lose||3–5 || align=left| Kim Ki-Soo 
| ||  || 
|align=left| 
|align=left|
|- align=center
|Lose||3–4 || align=left| Jesse Cortez
| ||  || 
|align=left| 
|align=left|
|- align=center
|Lose||3–3 || align=left| Koji Okano
| ||  || 
|align=left| 
|align=left|
|- align=center
|Win||3–2 || align=left| Akio Matsunaga
| ||  || 
|align=left| 
|align=left|
|- align=center
|Lose||2–2 || align=left| Musashi Nakano
| ||  || 
|align=left| 
|align=left|
|- align=center
|Lose||2–1 || align=left| Eduardo Canete
| ||  || 
|align=left| 
|align=left|
|- align=center
|Win||2–0 || align=left| Filipino Ravalo
| ||  || 
|align=left| 
|align=left|
|- align=center
|Win||1–0 || align=left| Phil Robinson
| ||  || 
|align=left| 
|align=left|

References

2006 deaths
Boxers at the 1964 Summer Olympics
Olympic boxers of the Philippines
Boxers at the 1962 Asian Games
Medalists at the 1962 Asian Games
Place of birth missing
Filipino male boxers
Sportspeople from Tarlac
People from Tarlac City
Asian Games gold medalists for the Philippines
Asian Games medalists in boxing
1938 births
Welterweight boxers